Central Pacific Conservation Area is an administrative area which is managed by SINAC for the purposes of conservation in the southwestern part of Costa Rica, on the Pacific coast. It contains four National Parks, and a number Wildlife refuges and other types of nature reserve.

Protected areas
 Carara National Park
 El Chompipe Hill Protected Zone
 Finca Barú del Pacífico Mixed Wildlife Refuge
 Hacienda La Avellana Mixed Wildlife Refuge
 La Cangreja National Park
 La Ensenada Mixed Wildlife Refuge
 Manuel Antonio National Park
 Montes de Oro Protected Zone
 Pájaros Island Biological Reserve
 Peñas Blancas Wildlife Refuge
 Playa Blanca Marine Wetland
 Playa Hermosa-Punta Mala Wildlife Refuge
 Portalón Mixed Wildlife Refuge
 Puntarenas Estuary and Associated Mangrove Swamps Wetland
 Redondo Hill Private Wildlife Refuge
 San Lucas Island National Park
 Tivives Protected Zone
 Transilvania Private Wildlife Refuge

References

External links 
 Central Pacific Conservation Area at Costa Rica National Parks site

Conservation Areas of Costa Rica